Surveyor 4 was the fourth lunar lander in the American uncrewed Surveyor program sent to explore the surface of the Moon. This spacecraft crashed after an otherwise flawless mission; telemetry contact was lost 2.5 minutes before touchdown. The planned landing target was Sinus Medii (Central Bay) at 0.4° north latitude and 1.33° west longitude.

Surveyor 6 successfully landed near the crash site of Surveyor 4 a few months later in November 1967.

Equipment
This spacecraft was the fourth in a series designed to achieve a soft landing on the Moon and to return photography of the lunar surface for determining characteristics of the lunar terrain for Apollo lunar landing missions. Equipment on board included a television camera and auxiliary mirrors, a soil mechanics surface sampler, strain gauges on the spacecraft landing legs, and numerous engineering sensors. Like Surveyor 3, Surveyor 4 was also equipped with a surface claw (with a magnet in the claw) to detect and measure ferrous elements in the lunar surface.

After a flawless flight to the Moon, radio signals from the spacecraft ceased during the terminal-descent phase at 02:03 UT on July 17, 1967, approximately 2.5 minutes before touchdown. Contact with the spacecraft was never reestablished, and the mission was unsuccessful. The solid-fuel retrorocket may have exploded near the end of its scheduled burn.

See also

 1967 in spaceflight
 List of artificial objects on the Moon

References

External links
 Surveyor Program Results (PDF) 1969

4
Spacecraft launched in 1967
Spacecraft launched by Atlas-Centaur rockets
Spacecraft that impacted the Moon
Missions to the Moon
1967 on the Moon